Jach'a Khuchi (Aymara jach'a big, khuchi pig, "big pig", also spelled Jachcha Kochi) is a  mountain in the Bolivian Andes. It is located in the Cochabamba Department, in the east of the Bolívar Province. Jach'a Khuchi lies northwest of Sirk'i.

References 

Mountains of Cochabamba Department